Ryan Orlando Thompson (born November 4, 1967) is an American former professional outfielder. He played all or parts of nine seasons in the majors between 1992 and 2002 for the New York Mets, Cleveland Indians, Houston Astros, New York Yankees, Florida Marlins and Milwaukee Brewers of Major League Baseball (MLB). Thompson also played one season in Japan for the Fukuoka Daiei Hawks in 1998.

Ryan Thompson was traded by the Toronto Blue Jays to the Mets in 1992, along with Jeff Kent, for David Cone.

Thompson is the father of basketball player Trevor Thompson.

References

External links
, or Retrosheet, or Pelota Binaria (Venezuelan Winter League)

1967 births
Living people
African-American baseball players
American expatriate baseball players in Canada
American expatriate baseball players in Japan
American expatriate baseball players in Mexico
Baseball players from Maryland
Binghamton Mets players
Buffalo Bisons (minor league) players
Calgary Cannons players
Cardenales de Lara players
American expatriate baseball players in Venezuela
Cleveland Indians players
Dunedin Blue Jays players
Florida Marlins players
Fukuoka Daiei Hawks players
Guerreros de Oaxaca players
Houston Astros players
Indianapolis Indians players
Knoxville Blue Jays players
Major League Baseball outfielders
Medicine Hat Blue Jays players
Mexican League baseball left fielders
Mexican League baseball right fielders
Milwaukee Brewers players
Nippon Professional Baseball outfielders
New Orleans Zephyrs players
New York Mets players
New York Yankees players
Ottawa Lynx players
People from Chestertown, Maryland
St. Catharines Blue Jays players
Syracuse Chiefs players
21st-century African-American people
20th-century African-American sportspeople

fr:Ryan Thompson